Ultra-high-net-worth individuals (UHNWI) are defined as having a net worth of at least US$30 million in constant 2018 dollars. Other sources such as Credit Suisse define UHNWI as adults with wealth above USD 50 million. It is the wealth segment above very-high-net-worth individuals (greater than $5 million) and high-net-worth-individuals (greater than $1 million). Although they constitute only 0.003% of the world's population (less than 1 in 33,000), they hold 13% of the world's total wealth. By 2017, there were 226,450 individuals designated as UHNWI, representing an increase of 3.5%, with their combined total wealth increasing to $27 trillion.

Definitions and ranking
Ultra-high-net-worth individuals are defined in the report as having a net worth of at least US$30 million in investible assets net of liabilities (after deducting residential and passion investments such as art, planes, yachts and personal real estate). At last count, there were 211,275 UHNW individuals in the world, with a total combined net worth of US$29.7 trillion. Billionaires are a special category of UHNW individuals, having net worth in excess of US$1 billion. According to the Billionaire Census 2014, there were 2,325 billionaires in the world, with a combined net worth of US$7.3 trillion. In 2014, these individuals represented just over 1% of the world's UHNW population and 24% of the world's UHNW total wealth. The June 27, 2017 "World Ultra Wealth Report" analysed the state of the world's ultra-high-net-worth (UHNW) population, or those with $30m or more in net worth. The number of UHNW individuals globally grew 3.5% to 226,450 individuals. Their combined total wealth increased by 1.5% to $27 trillion.

According to Credit Suisse, there were 264,200 ultra-high-net-worth individuals with net worth above USD 50 million at the end of 2021.

Reports 
The "World Ultra Wealth Report", on ultra high net worth (UHNW) populations—those with "$30m or more in net worth", which was published on June 27, 2017, "this year revealed global growth of 3.5% to 226,450 individuals and a 1.5% increase of their total combined wealth to $27 trillion."

World Ultra Wealth Report 

The World Ultra Wealth Report 2013 was co-published by Wealth-X and UBS. The fifth edition of the report was published on June 27, 2017. Previous World Ultra Wealth Reports were published independently by Wealth-X, in 2011 and 2012 respectively.

Boston Consulting Group Global Wealth Report 
The Boston Consulting Group (BCG) 2014 Global Wealth Report, shows that liquid wealth of the super-rich, referenced as Ultra-High-Net-Worth households, had increased by 20% in 2013. BCG uses a household definition of UHNW, which places only those with more than $100 million liquid financial wealth into the UHNW-category, more than the usual $30 million, with which the ultra-category had been created in 2007. . They control 5.5% of global financial wealth. 5,000 of them live in the US, followed by China, Britain and Germany. BCG expects the trend toward more concentrated wealth to continue unabated. While financial wealth of the sub-millionaires is expected to increase by 3.7% annually until 2019, the expected growth rate for the super-rich is 9.1%. The share of this group in global financial wealth would thus increase to 6.5% by 2019.

UHNW characteristics
By 2013, 65% of the world's UHNW population was self-made, as opposed to 19% who had inherited their fortune and 16% who had inherited and grown their wealth. These proportions change dramatically by gender. In the 2013 report, it was revealed that only 12% of the world's UHNW population is female, and of these, only 33% are self-made, as opposed to 70% of male UHNW. According to the same 2013 report, twenty-two percent of self-made UHNW individuals have derived their wealth from finance, banking and investment. Almost 15% of individuals with inherited wealth are engaged in non-profit and social organisations.

As of 2014, Asia's growth was expected to continue, and this change in demographics has significant impact on the various organizations that target UHNW individuals, such as luxury companies, financial institutions, charities and universities.

Billionaire Census 
The Billionaire Census is a co-publication of Wealth-X and UBS.

In 2013 for example, the average net worth of the world's billionaire is US$3 billion, with a liquidity on average of 18% of net worth. 60% of the world's billionaires are self-made, 20% have inherited their fortune and 20% have both inherited and grown their wealth. 18% of the world's billionaires have derived their wealth from finance, banking and investment; as opposed to 9% from industrial conglomerates and 7% from the real estate industry. The average billionaire is 62 years old, and 89% of the world's billionaires are male. Approximately 68% of them have a bachelor's degree or higher levels of education.

UHNWI role in economies: luxury industry and UHNW individuals as consumers 

UHNW individuals are of crucial importance not only to the finance, banking and investment industry; but also to luxury companies who target UHNW individuals, charities, universities and schools amongst others. UHNW individuals are notable players in the field of philanthropy; many have their own private foundations and support a variety of causes, from education to poverty relief.

Financial institutions are known for their targeting of UHNW individuals, having specific parts of their bank designed to manage the wealth of their UHNW clients.  In addition, research on the UHNW is particularly important with upcoming intergenerational wealth transfers in the UHNW population. For example, as of 2014, luxury companies typically target UHNW as a separate segment of their clientele. Daily Finance in 2014, projected that growth in UHNW population in Asia looked promising for the future of the luxury industry. The India's Economic Times said in 2014 that, despite wide report on the luxury industry's troubled year with China's luxury spenders, luxury industry experts continued to be optimistic for their long-term performance, especially from UHNW individuals. According to Savills and Wealth-X, in 2014, UHNW individuals are particularly relevant to the real estate sector, with the total UHNW population's real estate holdings accounting for over US$5 trillion by 2014, or 3% of the world's real estate holdings. This is a huge proportion considering this population is only 0.003% of the world's population.

Offshore bank

By 2012, according to Reuters, the UHNW individuals held $32 trillion in offshore havens.

See also 
 Wealth
 List of countries by wealth per adult
 Plutonomy

Reliable sources

References (unconfirmed)

Wealth concentration
Distribution of wealth